Heinrich Rudolf Schinz (30 March 1777 – 8 March 1861) was a Swiss physician and naturalist.

Biography
Schinz was born in Zürich and studied medicine at the universities of Würzburg and Jena. In 1798 he received his doctorate and subsequently returned to his hometown of Zürich as a medical practitioner. In 1804 he became a teacher of physiology and natural history at the medical-surgical institute in Zürich, and from 1833 to 1855 he served as an associate professor of zoology at the university of Zurich.

Works
He was also curator at the natural history society of Zurich, and was the author of many important zoological works; such as:
 Das Thierreich eingetheilt nach dem Bau der Thiere als Grundlage (1821–25), translation of Georges Cuvier's Le Règne Animal, with numerous additions. 
 Naturschichte und Abbildungen der Fische, Schaffhausen, 1836, doi:10.3931/e-rara-85906 (vol. 1), doi:10.3931/e-rara-85907 (vol. 2) (Digitized edition at e-rara.), Karl Joseph Brodtmann lithographed the plates.
 Naturgeschichte und Abbildungen der Reptilien, Schaffhausen, 1833–1835, doi:10.3931/e-rara-79384 (vol. 1), doi:10.3931/e-rara-79847 (vol. 2) (Digitized edition at e-rara), Karl Joseph Brodtmann lithographed the plates.
 Europäsche Fauna (1840).

Gallery

References

Bibliography
Mearns and Mearns - Biographies for Birdwatchers 

1777 births
1861 deaths
19th-century Swiss zoologists
Swiss mammalogists
Swiss ornithologists
Scientists from Zürich
Academic staff of the University of Zurich
University of Jena alumni
University of Würzburg alumni
Members of the German Academy of Sciences Leopoldina
18th-century Swiss zoologists